Hydrogenated poly-1-decene is a colourless glazing agent. It is "a mixture of isoparaffinic molecules of known structure, prepared by hydrogenation of mixtures of tri-, tetra- penta- and hexa-1-decenes". It was reviewed in 2001 by the Scientific Committee on Food of the DG Health. It was "proposed as a substitute for white mineral oil. The food additive applications include those of glazing agent for confectionery and dried fruit, and processing aid uses as a lubricant and release agent, especially in bread baking using tins. It has been permitted for use in Finland, and a “Case of Need” has been accepted in the United
Kingdom." The substance is a mix of inert saturated hydrocarbons, which are not easily metabolised.

References

E-number additives
Hydrocarbons